Abdulelah Al-Shammeri (born 24 January 1999) is a Saudi Arabian professional footballer who plays as an attacking midfielder or winger for Saudi Pro League club Damac on loan from Al-Shabab.

He is the younger brother of Abdulmalek Al-Shammeri.

Career
Al-Shammeri started his career at Al-Shabab and was first called up to the first team during the 2018–19 season. On 30 June 2019, Al-Shammeri was chosen in the Saudi program to develop football talents established by General Sports Authority in Saudi Arabia. On 13 October 2020, Al-Shammeri joined Al-Tai on loan for the 2020–21 season. He scored four times in 33 appearances as Al-Tai earned promotion to the Pro League. He returned to Al-Shabab following the conclusion of his loan and signed a three-year deal with the club on 21 July 2021. He made his debut for Al-Shabab on 12 August 2021 in the 2–1 defeat away to Abha. On 15 August 2021, Al-Shammeri joined Al-Hazem on loan. On 4 August 2022, Al-Shammeri joined Damac on a season-long loan.

Career statistics

Club

References

External links
 
 

1999 births
Living people
Sportspeople from Riyadh
Saudi Arabian footballers
Association football midfielders
Association football wingers
Saudi First Division League players
Saudi Professional League players
Al-Shabab FC (Riyadh) players
Al-Tai FC players
Al-Hazem F.C. players
Damac FC players
Saudi Arabia youth international footballers